Bhootwala Serial is a comedy show that aired on SAB TV and premiered on 23 February 2009.

Cast 
 Kiku Sharda as Amarnath Bhandari
 Rajesh Kumar as Vicky
 Sheetal Maulik as Riya
 Dhruv Singh as Ram
 Anup Upadhyay as Kamuk Kamlesh
 Manju Brijnandan Sharma as Kusumkali
 Melissa Pais as Katili
 Suresh Chatwal as Kusumkali's father

References

External links

Sony SAB original programming
Indian comedy television series
2009 Indian television series debuts
2009 Indian television series endings
Horror comedy television series
Ghosts in television